Rudolph Nelson Niswanger (born November 9, 1982) is a former American football center. He was signed by the Kansas City Chiefs as an undrafted free agent in 2006. He played college football at Louisiana State.

Early years
He is a native of Monroe, Louisiana, where he attended Ouachita Christian High School. He led his team to a 2A State Championship title in Football.

College career
During his college career, he started at least one game in every offensive line position. As a senior, he was team captain and was elected as Second-team All-SEC.

Professional career

Kansas City Chiefs
In 2006 season, Rudy signed a free agent contract with the Kansas City Chiefs. He played in five games at two different positions - guard and on special teams - in his first season. During the 2007 season, Niswanger appeared in 12 games, including five games as a reserve guard. His season ended on December 2 in a game against the San Diego Chargers, when he injured his right knee. He was placed on injured reserve the next day. Before the 2008 season, Niswanger became the starting center in the preseason. He started in 15 games, missing one game against the Chargers in Week 15.

A restricted free agent in the 2009 offseason, Niswanger re-signed with the Chiefs on April 24. During the offseason, the Chiefs signed veteran Mike Goff, who competed with Niswanger for the starting center position.

Detroit Lions
Niswanger signed with the Detroit Lions on August 10, 2011. Niswanger was cut by the team on September 3, 2011.

Personal life
Niswanger is married to Patricia Hodge of Monroe, Louisiana and they make their home in Monroe, Louisiana, and they have 5 children.  He is CEO of Joe Gear Companies.

References

External links
Kansas City Chiefs bio
LSU Tigers bio

1982 births
Living people
Sportspeople from Monroe, Louisiana
Players of American football from Louisiana
American football centers
LSU Tigers football players
Kansas City Chiefs players
Detroit Lions players
William V. Campbell Trophy winners